Mogila is a municipality in south-central North Macedonia. Mogila is also the name of the village where the municipal seat is found. Mogila Municipality is part of the Pelagonia Statistical Region.

Geography
The municipality borders Demir Hisar Municipality to the northwest, Kruševo Municipality and Krivogaštani Municipality to the north, Prilep Municipality to the northeast, Novaci Municipality to the southeast, and Bitola Municipality to the southwest.

Demographics
According to the last national census from 2021 this municipality has 5,283 inhabitants. Ethnic groups in the municipality include:

References

External links
 Official website

 
Pelagonia Statistical Region
Municipalities of North Macedonia